Lee Seung-yeop (born 20 July 2000) is a South Korean footballer currently playing as a forward for Gyeongnam.

Career statistics

Club

Notes

References

2000 births
Living people
South Korean footballers
Association football forwards
K League 1 players
Gyeongnam FC players